Paykullia maculata is a species of fly in the family Rhinophoridae first described by Carl Fredrik Fallén in 1815.

Distribution
This species can be found in most of Europe (Austria, Great Britain, Czech Republic, Denmark, France, Germany, Hungary, Ireland, Italy, Norway, Poland, Slovakia, Sweden, Switzerland, Netherlands)  Habitats include wetlands, woodlands, parks and gardens.

Description
The adults of this species are very variable, especially in size and in the pattern of wing markings. These small flies have a shining black body with bristly hair. The apical half of the wings show darkened veins and costal area.

Biology
Adults can be seen from May to September, with several generations. Usually they rest or run around on stones or among the foliage. The larvae are intestinal parasites of Porcellio scaber and Oniscus asellus, and woodlice from Protracheoniscus and Trachelipus genera.

References

Rhinophoridae
Insects described in 1815
Brachyceran flies of Europe